The 7th constituency of Val-d'Oise is a French legislative constituency in the Val-d'Oise département.
It is currently represented by Dominique Da Silva of Renaissance (RE).

Description

The 7th constituency of Val-d'Oise lies in the east of the department and includes a portion of Sarcelles and the whole of Montmorency and Domont together they form the northernmost suburbs of the Paris Metropolitan Area.

The seat has historically swung between left and right, however it was held, albeit narrowly, in three successive elections by the UMP from 2002 to 2012, before falling to LREM in 2017.

Historic Representation

Election results

2022

 
 
 
 
 
 
 
 
|-
| colspan="8" bgcolor="#E9E9E9"|
|-

2017

2012

 
 
 
 
 
|-
| colspan="8" bgcolor="#E9E9E9"|
|-

2007

 
 
 
 
 
 
 
|-
| colspan="8" bgcolor="#E9E9E9"|
|-

2002

 
 
 
 
 
 
|-
| colspan="8" bgcolor="#E9E9E9"|
|-

1997

 
 
 
 
 
 
 
 
|-
| colspan="8" bgcolor="#E9E9E9"|
|-

Sources
Official results of French elections from 2002: "Résultats électoraux officiels en France" (in French).

7